The Puerto Rico Practical Shooting Association is the Puerto Rican association for practical shooting under the International Practical Shooting Confederation.

References 

Regions of the International Practical Shooting Confederation
Sports governing bodies in Puerto Rico